"Sgt. Wilson's Little Secret" is an episode in the British comedy series Dad's Army. It was originally transmitted on Saturday 22 March 1969.

Synopsis
When Mrs Pike mentions having a child around the house again, Wilson gets the wrong idea, and is forced to offer to marry Mrs Pike.

Plot
When Mrs Pike plans to take in an evacuee, Wilson misunderstands and thinks that she is pregnant. Mainwaring orders him to marry her, and just as the preparations are under way, Mrs Pike leads in a 10-year-old Cockney evacuee also named Arthur. The wedding doesn't take place.

Cast

Arthur Lowe as Captain Mainwaring
John Le Mesurier as Sergeant Wilson
Clive Dunn as Lance Corporal Jones
John Laurie as Private Frazer
James Beck as Private Walker
Arnold Ridley as Private Godfrey
Ian Lavender as Private Pike
Janet Davies as Mrs Pike
Graham Harboard as Little Arthur (portrayed by Bill Pertwee in the audio drama)

Notes
Until 2001, when two "lost" episodes ("Operation Kilt" and "The Battle of Godfrey's Cottage") were found, "Sgt. Wilson's Little Secret" was the only episode surviving from the second series.

Further reading

External links

 

Dad's Army radio episodes
Dad's Army (series 2) episodes
1969 British television episodes